Parnell Street is a street in Dublin, Ireland, which runs from Capel Street in the west to Gardiner Street and Mountjoy Square in the east. It is at the north end of O'Connell Street, where it forms the south side of Parnell Square.

History 

Originally, Parnell Street was part of the ancient road connecting the old city to the northern coast, with Father Matthew Bridge connecting Church Street and Wood Quay in the east, to Ballybough and Fairview in the west. During the 18th century, the development of Amiens Street and Annesley Bridge provided a new coast road, and Parnell Street and its continuation to the east, Summerhill, became home to Georgian architecture. The Rotunda Hospital, the Ambassador Theatre and the Gate Theatre are all on Parnell Street.

In 1748, Bartholomew Mosse bought land from William Naper on Parnell Street to construct the Rotunda Hospital. William Corbett lived at No. 57 Parnell Street.

Formerly Great Britain Street, the street was renamed after Charles Stewart Parnell when Dublin Corporation adopted a resolution on 1 October 1911, after the erection of the statue to Parnell on the street as it meets O'Connell Street. No original eighteenth or nineteenth century properties are now standing.

The western end of Parnell Street has been substantially redeveloped in recent years. The urban regeneration came after road plans by Dublin Corporation devastated the street in the 1970s, when it was scheduled to be part of the Inner Tangent Road scheme, causing massive dereliction and blight. Virtually all of the original Georgian architecture was destroyed, the numerous business and houses demolished and subsequently replaced by buildings of a much larger scale. The street was developed into a dual-carriageway. The Ilac Centre is the oldest shopping centre in the city centre and has an entrance onto Parnell Street.

The Parnell Monument was constructed at the junction of Parnell Street and O'Connell Street in 1906-07.

Ireland's largest independent bookshop, Chapters Bookstore in Parnell Street, traded for 40 years before closing in 2022.

Regeneration
The Moore Street Mall also has an entrance on Parnell Street. Cineworld (UGC) cinema on Parnell Street is the largest cinema in Ireland, with 17 screens. The street also has flagship city centre stores for German discount supermarket chains such as Aldi and Lidl.

A Stringfellow's restaurant and strip club operated on Parnell Street for a number of months before closing because of poor trading performance. Various residents' associations, women's groups and Christian groups had campaigned against it, and its demise has been linked to those protests.

The eastern end of Parnell Street, having remained comparatively undeveloped, is now home to a thriving immigrant community. Most notably, a plethora of authentic Chinese and Korean restaurants have lent the east side the reputation of being Dublin's Chinatown. There is also a significant presence of African and East and Central European businesses at the eastern end.

References

See also
List of streets and squares in Dublin

Streets in Dublin (city)
Shopping districts and streets in Ireland
Parnell Square